Renee Ghosh is a Lebanese actress.

Filmography

Film 
I Offered You Pleasure - Imane (Short). 2011
 Love Me. 2003 Helper Director

Television 
Samra. 2016
Youngs and Girls. 1996
Spring of the Love. 1995
Fingers from Gold. 1995

Dubbing roles 
 M.I. High
 Prophet Joseph - Tama
 Toy Story 2 - Barbie (Classical Arabic version)
 Toy Story 3 - Barbie (Classical Arabic version)
 Xiaolin Showdown - Kimiko

Writing Career 
 '' Yara (film)

References

External links 
 

Living people
Lebanese film actresses
21st-century Lebanese actresses
Lebanese voice actresses
Year of birth missing (living people)
Lebanese television actresses